The Beaumont Trophy is a cycle road race first run in 1952. The Trophy was presented to the Gosforth Road Club by Rex Beaumont who was a local cycle wholesaler on Tyneside. The Gosforth Road Club had been created in July 1951 as an offshoot of the Ridley Cycling Club as a result of young riders being unable to gain entry into local races. The race was run under BLRC Regulations from 1952 until 1959 when it came under the regulations of the newly formed British Cycling Federation. It was run continuously from 1952 to 2019, as the 2020 edition was cancelled due to the COVID-19 pandemic in the UK. This 67 year streak made it the longest-running road race in the UK. 
In the early 1950s the race started and finished in Gosforth Park where the clubhouse was situated. In the early '60s, the start/finish moved to Ponteland because of an increase in traffic. Race distances were normally 85–90 miles and the route was out and back finishing at Cottage Homes, Ponteland.

In the early 1980s the start/finish moved to the west of Newcastle but this did not last long. In the mid-'80s the race moved to Stamfordham where it has remained ever since. When it became a Premier Calendar event followed by it becoming a UCI 1.2 and then part of the National Road race series the distance increased to over 100 miles and started to use a circuit that normally incorporated the Ryals. The race became part of the Cyclone Festival of Cycling in 2007 as a British Cycling Premier Calendar Race. In 2011 it was the Men's British National Championships won by Bradley Wiggins; the Festival also ran the Women's National Road Race Championships won by Lizzie Armistead. The Beaumont Trophy was again the Men's National Road Race Championships in 2018 and was won by Connor Swift. Over the period of time the race has been held, it has used a number of different routes. It has used a variation of routes around Stamfordham for the past 20 years.

The race has been organised by the current organiser since 1984. It is part of the current British National Road Race Series and was a UCI 1.2 Race for 3 years.

Past winners

References

External links
Beaumont Trophy

Cycle races in England
Recurring sporting events established in 1951
1951 establishments in England
UCI Europe Tour races
Sport in Northumberland